Nicholas Lopez (born March 13, 1995) is an American professional baseball shortstop for the Kansas City Royals of Major League Baseball (MLB). He made his MLB debut in 2019.

Amateur career
Lopez attended Naperville Central High School in Naperville, Illinois. In 2013, as a senior, he batted .398. After high school, he enrolled and played college baseball at Creighton University. In 2016, his junior season, he hit .306 with two home runs and 22 RBIs in 55 games. After the season, he was drafted by the Kansas City Royals in the fifth round of the 2016 Major League Baseball draft.

Professional career
Lopez made his professional debut with the Burlington Royals and spent the whole 2016 season there, posting a .281 batting average with six home runs, 29 RBIs and 24 stolen bases in 62 games. In 2017, he spent time with both the Wilmington Blue Rocks and the Northwest Arkansas Naturals, batting a combined .279 with two home runs, 38 RBIs, 24 stolen bases and a .704 OPS in 129 games. After the season, the Royals assigned Lopez to the Surprise Saguaros of the Arizona Fall League. He began 2018 with Northwest Arkansas and was promoted to the Omaha Storm Chasers in June. In 130 total games between the two clubs, Lopez batted .308/.382/.417 with nine home runs and 53 RBIs.

Lopez began 2019 back with Omaha. On May 14, his contract was selected and he was called up to the major leagues for the first time. He made his debut that night versus the Texas Rangers.

Overall with the 2020 Kansas City Royals, Lopez batted .201 with one home run and 13 RBIs in 56 games. He had the lowest slugging percentage of all qualified hitters in the AL, at .266. Lopez was nominated for the Gold Glove at second base, having erroneously been omitted from the initial list of finalists. He eventually lost out on the award to César Hernández of Cleveland.

During 2021 Spring Training, Lopez switched his number from 1 to 8 to allow Jarrod Dyson to wear number 1. Having hit .118 in 34 at-bats in Spring Training, Lopez was optioned to Triple-A Omaha, with Whit Merrifield expected to assume the starting second baseman role. However, an injury to shortstop Adalberto Mondesí in the final game of Spring Training forced him onto the injured list, and Lopez began the regular season as the Royals shortstop. Mondesí was activated and made his season debut on May 25, but returned to the injured list with a separate injury on June 6. Lopez was listed on the Royals All-Star ballot at the designated hitter position, despite not having played a game there during the season, as the team put Mondesí on the ballot at shortstop and Merrifield at second base. On August 19, Lopez hit his first home run of the season in a 3-6 loss against the Houston Astros. Lopez ended 2021 with 78 runs, 43 RBIs, 22 stolen bases and a .300 batting average, becoming the first regular Royals shortstop to bat .300 or better in a season. Defensively, he led all qualifying AL shortstops with a .987 fielding percentage.

Lopez played for the Italian national baseball team in the 2023 World Baseball Classic.

References

External links

Creighton Bluejays bio

Living people
1995 births
Baseball players from Illinois
Sportspeople from Naperville, Illinois
Major League Baseball infielders
Kansas City Royals players
Creighton Bluejays baseball players
Burlington Royals players
Wilmington Blue Rocks players
Northwest Arkansas Naturals players
Omaha Storm Chasers players
Surprise Saguaros players
American people of Italian descent
2023 World Baseball Classic players